George Reed Burrell Jr. (born January 1, 1948) is a former American football Safety. He played for the Denver Broncos in 1969.

References 

Living people

1948 births
American football defensive backs
Penn Quakers football players
Denver Broncos players